Til Bikram Nembang Limbu, professionally known as Bairagi Kainla or Bairagi Kaila, is a Nepalese poet and litterateur. He has served as Chancellor of the Nepal Academy from 2009 (2066 BS) to 2013 (2070 BS). Part of his significant literary struggle was the Tesro Aayam (Third Dimension) movement. During the early 1960s, he with Ishwor Ballav and Indra Bahadur Rai searched unexplored realms of Nepali literature and added a new dimension – the third dimension – to Nepalese literature.

He is currently working in the field of Folklore of Limbu ethnic people of Eastern Nepal. He is also working to promote the culture, language and literature of the minor community, nationalities and indigenous people of Nepal. Bairagi Kainla was nominated as a member of the Royal Nepal Academy in 1990.

Early life and education

Bairagi Kainla was born in 1939 and learnt his first letters at home. He was taught by local teachers. He lived in a joint family and his father had six wives. Kainla's father was quite ahead of his times. He was liberal enough to send him to study Science in Darjeeling. But more than formal studies, Kainla became busy in literary programmes. 

In Darjeeling, Kainla met Indra Bahadur Rai and Ishwar Ballav in college whose encouragement became pivotal in shaping his poet-personality. These trio's incessant debates on writing incited the publishing of their magazine titled Phool Paat Patkar where they published poetry, essays and short stories.

Born in joint family, Kainla grew up with eight brothers and six sisters. Always having someone around him was the best part of being grown up in big family, Kainla remembers. He also remembers that the sad part of big family was that the women in the family had to wake up around four o'clock in the morning and start their daily chores. 

He recalls that his father was among the first of Limbu to emphasize education and he had sent his children far away from home for further studies. His father had also published the first Limbu lyrical poetry Kirat Mikhan Samlo (Kirat Jagaran Geet) which was later translated to Devnagari by Kainla in 2038 BS.

In conversation with Para Limbu, Chairperson of Spiny Babbler, he said,

He studied Science and completed Intermediate of Science (ISc) from Darjeeling Government College affiliated to Calcutta University.

Career

Beginning
Bairagi Kainla's poetical works began since the early 1960s while he was a young student in Darjeeling. During the time, hand written magazines were popular as printing was costly. Kainla published lot of his work in them.

The Third Dimension (Tesro Aayam)

Kainla met Indra Bahadur Rai and Ishwor Ballav in college in Darjeeling, whose encouragement became pivotal in shaping his poet-personality. Their incessant debates on writing incited the publishing of their magazine Phool Paat Patkar with their pocket money where they published poetry, essays and short stories.

Kainla formed a trio with Indra Bahadur Rai and Ishwor Ballav who came like a thunder with new literary trend and a powerful movement called Tesro Aayam (The Third Dimension). In 1963 AD, Kainla, Rai and Ballav first experimented with Tesro Aayam writing. They started the Aayameli movement from Darjeeling with the publication of a journal titled Tesro Aayam triggering a theoretical jolt in Nepali literature at the time.

Kainla did not write much, whatever he wrote he did most powerfully. He hails from Limbu community of eastern Nepal. He uses local myths and lore in his poetry leading to a diversion in traditional writing. Kainla's poetry is the song of freedom. He is a great freedom-fighter and participated actively in different movements. Deep undertone of love and revolt can be heard in his work. His poems of Bairagi kainlakaa Kavitaharu contains some masterpieces in Nepali.

Chancellor of the Nepal Academy
Kainla served as a Chancellor of Nepal Academy from 2066 BS to 2070 BS.

Works

Publications

 Bairagi Kainlaka Kavitaharu, Sajha Prakasan, Bikram Samvat (B.S.) 2031/1974
 Sappok-Chomen:Limbu Jatima Kokh-Puja, Nepal Academy, B.S.2048/1991
 Nahen Mundhum:Irsya ra AankhiDahiko Aakhyan ra Anusthan, B.S 2051
 Samsogha Mundhum:Pretatmako Aakhyan ra Anusthan, B.S. 2051
 Sasik Mundhum: Moch-Marne Akhyan ra Anusthan, B.S. 2052
 Tongsimg Tokma Mundhum:Akhyan ra Anusthan, B.S. 2052
 Nawacoit Mundhum, B.S. 2060
 Andha Manchheharu ra Hatti, B.S. 2068
 Mujingna Kheyongna Mundhum, B.S. 2070
 Lahadongna-Suhampheba Mundhum, B.S. 2070
 Pajaiba Mundhum, B.S. 2070
 Khappunama Mellonghangma nu Luplinama Wadannama Mundhum, B.S. 2070
 Namsami-Kesami Mundhum, B.S. 2070

Translation: poetry

 Kirat Jagaran Geet (Limbu Lyrical Poetry) by Subba Kharga Bahadur Nembang Limbu, B.S. 2038

Edited: prose

Limbu Bibliography, Royal Nepal Academy, B.S. 2050
Limbu Bhasa Tatha Sahitya Vichar Gosthi, Royal Nepal Academy, B.S. 2050
Rastriya Bhasako Kavita Sangalo ( with A Yonjan), Royal Nepal Academy
Limbu Folktales (as a guest editor) in Saipatri, Royal Nepal Academy

Co-writing
Limbu Grammar, Yakthung Huppan-लिम्बू ब्याकरण

Magazine and journal editing

Tesro Aayam (Monthly), Darjeeling, A.D. 1963
Kavita (Quarterly), Royal Nepal Academy
Limbu Language and Literature, A Tri-Lingual Journal, Since A.D. 1993

Social activities

Former member,  Royal Nepal Academy (BS 2047-2056 /AD 1991-1999)
Former member, Linguistic Society of Nepal (Life Member)
President, Society for the Development of The Limbu Language, Literature and Culture 
Vice president, Nepal Center for Contemporary Studies (NCCS), Nepal
Former member, Nepal  National  Ethnographic Museum
Member,  Folklore Society of Nepal
Member, Ganeshman Singh Academy. Nepal
Convenor,  National Language Policy Advisory Committee, HMG, (BS 2050/AD 1993)
Member,  National Cultural Policy Recommendation Committee, HMG, (BS 2048/AD 1991)
Member,  Recommendation Committee for News Broadcast in Some National Languages of Nepal, HMG
Coordinator, Education For All, NNPA, Thematic Group on Indigenous Peoples and Linguistic Minorities, HMG, 2002
Life member, Royal Nepal Academy
Chairman,  Sajha Prakashan  Nepal (2004)
President, Democratic Creators United Forum, Nepal BS 2063
Former advisor, NEFEN
Advisor Kirat Yakthung Chumlung ( KYC)

Literary awards
Sajha Puraskar, B.S. 2031
Medals: Gorkha Dakshin Bahu (Second Class), B.S. 2051
Yuga Kavi SiddiCharan Puraskar, B.S. 2052
Harihar Shastri- Sabitri Devi Sahitya Puraskar, B.S. 2058
Shri Krishna Kumari Manorath Smriti Puraskar, B.S. 2060
Aadivasi Greeti Samman - B.S. 2063
Madhuparka Samman, B.S. 2065
Vishist Shrasta Samman, B.S. 2066 (Nari Sahitya Pratishthan, Kathmandu)
Iman Singh Chemjong Sahitya Puraskar, Sikkim, India, 2011
Jagadamba Shree Puraskar, 2075 BS

References

External links

https://www.youtube.com/watch?v=sppGIS-mGEw

Nepalese academic administrators
Living people
Nepali-language writers
Nepalese male poets
1939 births
People from Panchthar District
21st-century Nepalese educators
20th-century Nepalese male writers
Jagadamba Shree Puraskar winners
Sajha Puraskar winners
Limbu people